Oryukdo (literally meaning Five–Six island) is group of islands located in Yongho-dong, Nam-gu, Busan, South Korea. The name reflects the fact that the island group can consist of either five or six islands, depending on the current tides.

The islands are uninhabited except for Deungdaedo, which has a lighthouse. The other islands are Usakdo, Surido, Gonggotdo, and Guldo. Depending on water level, Usakdo can also be separated into two islands, which are then named Bangpaedo and Sol.

The Oryukdo Skywalk is a glass viewing platform positioned on a cliff overlooking the islands which opened in 2013.

References 

Islands of Busan
Nam District, Busan
Islands of the Sea of Japan